Thomas Mathias Lenihan (August 12, 1844 – December 15, 1901) was an Irish-born American prelate of the Catholic Church who served as bishop of the Diocese of Cheyenne in Wyoming from 1896 until his death in 1901. He was the brother of Bishop Mathias Clement Lenihan.

Biography

Early life 
Thomas Lenihan was born on August 12, 1844, in Mallow, County Cork, in Ireland to Edmund and Mary (née Donovan) Lenihan. When he was about five years old, he family immigrated to the United States and settled in Dubuque, Iowa, by 1850. He was raised in the parish of St. Raphael's Cathedral in Dubuque and served as an altar boy there. At his confirmation by Bishop Mathias Loras, Lenihan took the name Mathias in honor of the bishop.

At age 12, Lenihan entered St. Thomas Seminary in Bardstown, Kentucky, where he received his classical education. He then studied philosophy at St. Vincent's Seminary in Cape Girardeau, Missouri Lenihan completed his theological training at Saint Francis de Sales Seminary in St. Francis, Wisconsin.

Priesthood 
Lenihan was ordained a priest in Dubuque on November 19, 1867, by Bishop John Hennessy at St. Raphael's Cathedral. His younger brother, Mathias Lenihan was ordained in 1879 and become Bishop of Great Falls in Montana, in 1904.

Following his ordination, Lenihan was named pastor of St. Benedict's Parish in Decorah, Iowa.. He was transferred in 1870 to serve as pastor of Corpus Christi Parish in Fort Dodge, Iowa, remaining there until 1897. While in Fort Dodge, Lenihan oversaw the completion of the present church in 1881. His charge included an extensive mission that stretched over 200 miles, from Des Moines, Iowa to the Minnesota border and from Ackley to Sioux City, Iowa. He established many new parishes in this area, including Immaculate Conception Parish in Lehigh, Iowa (1881) and St. John's Parish in Vincent, Iowa (1895).

In civic affairs, Lenihan was appointed to the state's Russian famine relief committee by Governor Horace Boies. He also spoke out in favor of the prohibition of alcohol and encouraged the formation of temperance societies.

Bishop of Cheyenne 
In 1893, it was reported that the Vatican was planning to erect a new Diocese of Sioux City and appoint Lenihan as bishop. However, the creation of the diocese was postponed for nine years and Lenihan was given a different appointment.

On December 18, 1896, Lenihan was named the second bishop of the Diocese of Cheyenne by Pope Leo XIII. At first there was some confusion in the press, who mistakenly believed that Reverend Bartholomew C. Lenihan, his cousin and the vicar general of the Archdiocese of Dubuque, had been appointed. Thomas Lenihan received his episcopal consecration on February 24, 1897, from Archbishop Hennessy, with Bishops Henry Cosgrove and Thomas Bonacum serving as co-consecrators, at St. Raphael's Cathedral.

The Diocese of Cheyenne had been without a bishop for nearly four years after his predecessor, Bishop Maurice Burke, had been transferred to the Diocese of Saint Joseph in Missouri and had argued for the suppression of the Wyoming diocese. When Lenihan arrived in Cheyenne in 1897, the diocese contained eight priests, nine churches, and one parochial school for 3,000 Catholics. By the time of his death three years later, there were 6,000 Catholics, 26 churches, 15 priests, and four parochial schools.

Later life and death
Lenihan's health deteriorated while in Wyoming due to its high altitude and low humidity. While retaining his title as bishop, he returned to Iowa in 1901 to live with his brother Mathius in Marshalltown. Despite his poor health, the bishops of the ecclesiastical province of Dubuque recommended him to be named bishop of Sioux City (the second time he had been suggested for that office) but the appointment never came.

Thomas Lenihan died in Marshalltown on December 15, 1901, at age 57.

References

1843 births
1901 deaths
People from County Cork
People from Cheyenne, Wyoming
Roman Catholic Archdiocese of Dubuque
Roman Catholic bishops of Cheyenne
St. Francis Seminary (Wisconsin) alumni
19th-century Roman Catholic bishops in the United States
Irish emigrants to the United States (before 1923)
Religious leaders from Iowa